The Mission Society of the Philippines (MSP) is a Society of Apostolic Life of the Latin Church of the Roman Catholic Church.

Overview
It was established by the Catholic Bishops' Conference of the Philippines (CBCP) – the country's episcopal body – in 1965 as the official and chief missionary arm of the Catholic Church in the Philippines. The Society received its pontifical right status on January 6, 2009 from the Vatican's Congregation for the Evangelization of Peoples (CEP).

The Society currently works in twelve countries and territories on five continents. It has missions in Asia in Thailand, Taiwan, Japan and South Korea; in Oceania, in Papua New Guinea, Australia, New Zealand, and The Cook Islands; in Europe, in the Netherlands and in England; in the United States of America; and in South America, in Guyana.

External links
 Mission Society of the Philippines website (retrieved 12 December 2011)

Catholic missionary orders
Christian organizations established in 1965
Catholic orders and societies
Catholic Church in New Zealand